Coroi is the name of several villages in Romania:

 Coroi, a village in Craiva, Arad
 Coroi, a village in Coroisânmărtin Commune, Mureș County